Anna Maycock was the captain of the Australia women's national volleyball team and successful international volleyball representative from South Australia. Maycock has been a member of the National Senior program since 2001, after getting her start in the National Junior program 1997. She also has played professionally in Europe playing with USSPA-Volley in Albi, France and teams in the German Bundesliga.

Maycock competed internationally at the 2002 World Championship Leipzig, Germany and Asian Championships since 2001 and the World University Games in 2001 and 2005. She has represented South Australian in the Australian Volleyball League since 2009 and plays for Mt Lofty Club at State League level.

Career Highlights
 Youth Australian National Team 
 Australian National Team 
 Captain of Australian National Team since 2004
 2012 Tanya Tarnogurski Trophy (State League Women Best & Fairest)

References

1982 births
Living people
Australian women's volleyball players